Constitutional Assembly of Estonia was the representative body whose goal was to create new Constitution of the Republic of Estonia. The assembly was composed on 20 August 1991 by the members from Committee of Estonia and Supreme Council of the Republic of Estonia. The assembly functioned until 10 April 1992.

Members
Members were as follows:

References

Politics of Estonia